The Kloppstert is a hill, roughly 553 metres high, in the southwestern Harz in Lower Saxony, Germany. In the topographical map printed in 1978 it can only be made out with difficulty that the third letter is an o and the penultimate one an r. Unfortunately a contour line runs over the letter r so that it looks like a p. In the digitalised  1:25,000 topographic map, the hill is wrongly named as the Klappstept.

Geography 
The hill lies about 1 kilometre south of Sieber, 570 metres east of the Fissenkenkopf and 370 metres northwest of the Adlersberg.

Other hills of the same name lie in the Harz near Lerbach and near Badenhausen as well as in the Solling hills southwest of Dassel.

References 

Hills of Lower Saxony
Hills of the Harz
Osterode (district)